is the fourth and last single released by the subgroup Petitmoni. It was released on November 14, 2001 and sold 300,320 copies. It peaked at number two on the Oricon Charts.

Track listing 
All songs are composed and written by Tsunku.
 
 
 "Pittari Shitai X'mas! (Instrumental)"

Members at the time of single 
 Kei Yasuda
 Maki Goto
 Hitomi Yoshizawa

References

External links 
 "Pittari Shitai X'mas!" entry on the Hello! Project official website  

Petitmoni songs
Zetima Records singles
2001 singles
Japanese-language songs
Song recordings produced by Tsunku
Songs written by Tsunku
2001 songs
Japanese Christmas songs